The Treaty of Fond du Lac may refer to either of two treaties made and signed in Duluth, Minnesota between the United States and the Ojibwe (Chippewa) Native American peoples.

1826 Treaty of Fond du Lac

The Ojibwe chiefs who were not in attendance to the First Treaty of Prairie du Chien agreed to its adhesion. The Ojibwe Nations granted to the United States the rights to minerals exploration and mining within Ojibwe lands located north of the Prairie du Chien Line. Provisions were also made for the Ojibwe living about Saint Mary's River. As addenda to this treaty, arrest warrants to certain individuals living outside the jurisdiction of the United States were issued and land grants to the Métis were made.

Signatories

1847 Treaty of Fond du Lac

This treaty ceded lands in a triangular area west of the Mississippi River, bounded by the Prairie du Chien Line, Mississippi River, Crow Wing River and Long Prairie River.
 
According to the oral histories of the Mille Lacs Band of Ojibwe, representatives from the Ho-Chunk Nation negotiated with the Lake Superior and Mississippi Chippewas before treaty discussions with the United States took place to guarantee the safety of the Ho-Chunk Nation which was about to be displaced from the Neutral Ground with the admission of much of Iowa Territory into the Union as the State of Iowa, in their Treaty of Washington (1846).  The Ho-Chunk were supposed to be removed to the land ceded by the two 1847 Ojibwe treaties along the Long Prairie River (now in Minnesota). Many refused. Some fled to Wisconsin and some to Nebraska. The balance were removed to Minnesota in 1848 and a second removal occurred in 1850 which brought in another portion of the Ho-Chunk to the area. Due to frequent skirmishes by Ojibwe and Dakota bands against one another the Ho-Chunk could not avoid being attacked at times. The Ho-Chunk were unhappy with the land and were eventually relocated to an area near the Blue Earth River in southern Minnesota in 1855.  After the Dakota rose up against whites in 1862 and the U.S.-Dakota war caused depopulation of southern Minnesota, many remaining Minnesota citizens were in no mood to allow the Ho-Chunk Nation to remain in the state, despite their neutrality during the hostilities. The Winnebago subsequently ceded their Minnesota lands to the United States per Treaty of Washington (1865) for relocation to South Dakota and then Nebraska. Meanwhile, the Ojibwe land ceded in 1847 remained in U.S. government hands and was eventually opened up to white settlement.

Signatories

The signatory headmen were the following:

Treaty adhesion:

Treaty adhesion approval:

Notes

External links
Text of the 1826 treaty
Text of the 1846 Ho-Chunk treaty
Text of the 1847 treaty
Text of the 1865 Ho-Chunk treaty

Fond du Lac
Ojibwe in the United States
Legal history of Michigan
Native American history of Michigan
Native American history of Minnesota
Native American history of Wisconsin
Pre-statehood history of Michigan
Pre-statehood history of Minnesota
Pre-statehood history of Wisconsin
Anishinaabe treaty areas
1826 treaties
1847 treaties